Andaeuk Haeb is a commune (khum) of Rotanak Mondol District in Battambang Province in north-western Cambodia.

Villages

 Andaeuk Haeb
 Svay Chuor
 Thma Prus
 Serei Voan
 Prey Ampor
 Kandal Steung
 Thvak

References

Communes of Battambang province
Rotanak Mondol District